Daniel Cnossen (born May 17, 1980) is an American biathlete and cross-country skier competing at the 2022 Winter Olympics. He won gold in the Biathlon at the 2018 Winter Paralympics – Men's 7.5 kilometres in the sitting division. He is a native of Topeka, Kansas and a double amputee. He lost both legs, above the knees, in the War in Afghanistan due to an improvised explosive device while he was a Navy SEAL. Cnossen also competed at the 2014 Winter Paralympics. Cnossen graduated from the United States Naval Academy in 2002. He earned a Master of Public Administration in 2016 from the John F. Kennedy School of Government at Harvard University and also a Master of Theological Studies in 2018 from the Divinity School.

2018 Winter Paralympics
Cnossen competed at the 2018 Winter Paralympics and created history in his second Paralympic appearance after claiming a gold medal in the men's 7.5km sitting biathlon event. In doing so he became the first American male and the second American ever to claim a gold medal in a biathlon event in either the Olympics or Paralympics after Kendall Gretsch, who achieved the feat at earlier at the same Paralympic games.

In addition to his gold medal achievement, Cnossen also clinched silver in the men's 15km cross-country skiing sitting, 12.5km biathlon sitting, 15km biathlon sitting and 10km cross-country classical sitting, and a bronze medal in the 1.1km cross-country sprint sitting. That year, Cnossen was named Male Paralympic Athlete of the Games as part of the 2018 Team USA Awards.

References

External links 
 
 

1980 births
Living people
United States Navy personnel of the War in Afghanistan (2001–2021)
United States Navy SEALs personnel
American amputees
American male biathletes
United States Navy officers
American male cross-country skiers
Paralympic gold medalists for the United States
Paralympic silver medalists for the United States
Paralympic bronze medalists for the United States
Biathletes at the 2018 Winter Paralympics
Cross-country skiers at the 2018 Winter Paralympics
Medalists at the 2018 Winter Paralympics
Medalists at the 2022 Winter Paralympics
Sportspeople from Topeka, Kansas
Biathletes at the 2014 Winter Paralympics
Cross-country skiers at the 2014 Winter Paralympics
Harvard Divinity School alumni
Harvard Kennedy School alumni
Paralympic medalists in cross-country skiing
Paralympic medalists in biathlon
Paralympic cross-country skiers of the United States
Paralympic biathletes of the United States